Mark Bradshaw (born 1983 in Sydney, Australia) is an Australian composer known for his work in film and television.

Early life
Bradshaw studied experimental music at the College of Fine Arts (COFA) in Sydney, Australia and later attended the University of Sydney.

Career
Bradshaw is best known for his work in several of Jane Campion's movies and TV series, including Bright Star and Top of the Lake. Bradshaw has composed for a variety of ensembles including string quartet, orchestra, and a cappella chorus.

Personal life
As of a 2010 interview, Bradshaw was living in London.

In August 2012, in Sydney, Bradshaw entered into a civil partnership with British actor Ben Whishaw. Whishaw and Bradshaw met around 2009 on the set of Bright Star where Whishaw played the role of English poet John Keats. The relationship remained private until being made public in 2013.

Work
 The Water Diary (short film), 2006
 Chacun son cinéma ou Ce petit coup au coeur quand la lumière s'éteint et que le film commence, "The Lady Bug" segment, 2007
 The Mirage (short film), 2008
 8, The Water Diary segment, 2008
 Bright Star, 2009
 A Passionate Woman (TV series), 2 episodes, 2010
 Resistance, 2011
 Top of the Lake (TV series), 7 episodes, 2013
 From the Bottom of the Lake (documentary), 2013
 The Daughter, 2015
 Top of the Lake: China Girl (TV series), 7 episodes, 2017
 O Holy Ghost (short film), 2019
 The Furnace, 2020
 You Won't Be Alone, 2022

Awards

References

External links

1983 births
20th-century Australian LGBT people
21st-century Australian LGBT people
Australian film score composers
Australian television composers
Gay composers
LGBT film score composers
Australian gay musicians
Living people
Male film score composers
Male television composers
Musicians from Sydney